The Convention on the Prohibition of the Use, Stockpiling, Production and Transfer of Anti-Personnel Mines and on their Destruction of 1997, known informally as the Ottawa Treaty, the Anti-Personnel Mine Ban Convention, or often simply the Mine Ban Treaty, aims at eliminating anti-personnel landmines (AP-mines) around the world. To date, there are 164 state parties to the treaty. One state (the Marshall Islands) has signed but not ratified the treaty, while 32 UN states, including China, Russia, and the United States have not; making a total of 33 United Nations states not party.

Chronology

Early action and draft Conventions

Threats to the comprehensive nature of the Convention

A major threat to the project of a Total ban Convention as endorsed by the 1996 Ottawa Conference was the danger of being watered down.

One example was the well-intended attempt made by Canada to win the support of Countries opposed to a total ban – in particular the US – by proposing a new approach: To replace the Draft Convention by a new text, composed of a "Chapeau-Convention", containing generalities only, and four annexed protocols, each one dealing with one of the main prohibitions: production, stockpiling, transfer and use of anti-personnel mines. This approach would allow some additional countries to join the process but at the price of allowing them to pick and choose only those prohibitions compatible with their military needs. This concept, which would keep only the appearance of a total ban treaty, would risk creating a confusing situation of varying legal situations, and would, in the first place, postpone a real comprehensive total ban, potentially indefinitely. This proposal did however not materialise as the US rebuffed the idea, believing that they could steer the negotiations into the Conference on Disarmament where it would be subject to the consensus rule.

Attempts to block the project of a Total Ban Convention

Countries opposing a total ban of APMs because of their military necessities had an interest to prevent any negotiations on a total ban and in particular in free standing negotiations as proposed by Austria.  
 
The smart way to achieve this aim was to insist on holding the relevant negotiations in the framework of the competent forum of the UN for disarmament negotiations, the Conference on Disarmament (CD). The catch is that the CD had many years previously become a dead end, because of fundamental disagreements among Member States on its agenda and because of the rule of consensus giving each member de facto the right of veto.

Further progress

Implementation

Treaty terms 
Besides ceasing the production and development of anti-personnel mines, a party to the treaty must destroy its stockpile of anti-personnel mines within four years, although it may retain a small number for training purposes (mine-clearance, detection, etc.). Within ten years after ratifying the treaty, the country should have cleared all of its mined areas. This is a difficult task for many countries, but at the annual meetings of the States Parties they may request an extension and assistance. The treaty also calls on States Parties to provide assistance to mine-affected persons in their own country and to provide assistance to other countries in meeting their treaty obligations.

The treaty covers only anti-personnel mines; it does not address mixed mines, anti-tank mines, remote-controlled claymore mines, anti-handling devices (booby traps), and other "static" explosive devices.

Destruction of stockpiles 
Signatory nations have destroyed more than 48 million stockpiled mines since the treaty's entry into force on 1 March 1999. One hundred and fifty-nine (159) countries have completed the destruction of their stockpiles or declared that they did not possess stockpiles to destroy.

Retention of landmines
Article 3 of the treaty permits countries to retain landmines for use in training in mine detection, mine clearance, or mine destruction techniques. 72 countries have taken this option. Of this group, 26 States Parties retain fewer than 1,000 mines. Only two have retained more than 10,000 mines: Turkey (15,100) and Bangladesh (12,500). A total of 83 States Parties have declared that they do not retain any antipersonnel mines, including 27 states that stockpiled antipersonnel mines in the past.
Canada retains mines for training, and also continues to make and use the "C19 Detonated Weapon" in combat. The latter does not qualify as a landmine under the treaty because it is fired by a person and not by a pressure plate.

Landmine-free countries 
Through 2015, 29 countries had cleared all known mined areas from their territory: Albania, Bhutan, Bulgaria, Burundi, Republic of the Congo, Costa Rica, Denmark, Djibouti, France, Gambia, Germany, Guinea-Bissau, Greece, Guatemala, Honduras, Hungary, Jordan, Malawi, Mozambique, Nicaragua, Nigeria, North Macedonia, Rwanda, Suriname, Swaziland, Tunisia, Uganda, and Venezuela. El Salvador finished clearing its landmines before joining the Treaty.

At the November–December 2009 Cartagena Summit for a Mine-Free World, Albania, Greece, Rwanda, and Zambia were also declared mine-free. On 2 December 2009, Rwanda was declared free of landmines. It followed a three-year campaign by 180 Rwandan soldiers, supervised by the Mine Awareness Trust and trained in Kenya, to remove over 9,000 mines laid in the country between 1990 and 1994. The soldiers checked and cleared 1.3 square km of land in twenty minefields. The official Cartagena Summit announcement came after the Rwandan Ministry of Defence's own announcement of the completion of the demining process on 29 November 2009. Under Article 5 of the Ottawa Treaty, Rwanda was requested to become mine-free by 1 December 2010.

On 18 June 2010, Nicaragua was declared free of landmines.

Two more countries became free of landmines in 2011. On 14 June 2011, Nepal was declared a landmine-free zone, making it the second country to be landmine-free in Asia. In December 2011, Burundi was declared landmine free.

On 5 December 2012 at the 12th Meeting of the States Parties, six states declared themselves landmine-free. These were the Republic of the Congo, Denmark, Gambia, Guinea-Bissau, Jordan, and Uganda.

On 17 September 2015, Mozambique was declared free of land mines after the last of some nearly 171,000 had been cleared over 20 years.

Landmine and Cluster Munition Monitor 
The Landmine and Cluster Munition Monitor ("the Monitor") is an initiative providing research for the ICBL and the Cluster Munition Coalition (CMC), and acting as their de facto monitoring regime.

As an initiative of ICBL which was founded in 1998 through Human Rights Watch, the Monitor gives monitoring on the humanitarian development and uses of landmines, cluster munitions, and explosive remnants of war (ERW). It provides reports on all aspects of the landmine, cluster munitions, and ERW issues. It issues annual report updates on all countries in the world, keeps an international network with experts, provides research findings for all mediums, and remains flexible to adapt its reports to any changes. The Monitor has earned respect with its transparency whose states must be provided under the relevant treaties for independent reporting. Its main audiences are not only governments, NGOs, and other international organizations, but also media, academics and the public.

States parties 

The Convention gained 122 country signatures when it opened for signing on 3 December 1997 in Ottawa, Canada. Currently, there are 164 States Parties to the Treaty. Thirty-two countries have not signed the treaty and one more has signed but did not ratify. The states that have not signed the treaty includes a majority of the permanent members of the United Nations Security Council: China, the United States, and Russia. In 2014, the United States declared that it will abide by the terms of the Treaty, except for landmines used on the Korean Peninsula. South Korea, like North Korea, has not signed the treaty, believing the use of landmines to be crucial to the defense of their territory against the other.

Criticism 
Criticism from academics, security officials, and diplomats is based on both the political process and the substance. The campaign for what became the Ottawa Treaty was led by a group of powerful non-governmental organizations, and instead of working within existing multilateral frameworks, including the Conference on Disarmament, based at the UN compound in Geneva (the Palais des Nations), an ad hoc framework was created that detoured around existing intergovernmental processes. Critics alleged that this represented a challenge to the sovereignty and responsibility of nation states for the defense of their citizens.

Substantively, critics view the treaty as naive and idealistic, in attempting to erase the reality of security threats that lead armies and defense forces to rely on landmines for protection against invasion and terror attacks. As a result, ratification has been far from universal, and many of the states that do not currently intend to ratify the treaty possess large stockpiles of anti-personnel mines. So far 35 countries have not signed the treaty; nonsignatories include the United States, Russia, China, Myanmar, United Arab Emirates, Cuba, Egypt, India, Israel, and Iran.

In Finland, the National Coalition Party and the Finns Party proposed withdrawing from the treaty. The stance is supported by the Finnish Ministry of Defence report from 2003, which sees landmines as an effective weapon against a mechanised invasion force. In early 2018, an MP from the National Coalition Party started a citizens' initiative to withdraw from the Ottawa Treaty. Also, the Minister of Defence Jussi Niinistö (Blue Reform; formerly Finns Party prior to its split) has been supporting withdrawal from the treaty, saying that he "wants to rip it in half". Since the beginning of the 2022 Russian invasion of Ukraine, the debate sparked up again in Finland, when the chairmans of the National Coalition Party Petteri Orpo and Finns Party Riikka Purra viewed joining the treaty as a mistake in a panel of the Finnish national broadcaster Yle on 1 March 2022, wanting to resign from the treaty. According to a questionnaire sent to Finnish parliamentary groups by a consortium of local newspapers Uutissuomalainen earlier during the invasion and published on 1 March 2022, the Finns Party (as well as its splinter group Power Belongs to the People), Christian Democrats and Movement Now supported resignation from the treaty, the National Coalition Party, Social Democratic Party and Left Alliance being undecided on the question, while the Centre Party, Green League and Swedish People's Party on the side of supporting staying in the treaty. The President of Finland Sauli Niinistö also commented that "there would be use for anti-personnel mines", and former Chief of Defence Gustav Hägglund considered joining the treaty "a grave mistake". In the same continuum, another citizens' initiative to resign from the treaty, left on 24 February 2022, gathered the required 50,000 signatures by 6 March 2022, and will proceed to the Parliament.

Ukraine has also signaled that it might have to withdraw from the treaty due to military necessity.

Opponents of banning anti-personnel mines give several reasons, among them that mines are a cheap and therefore cost-effective area denial weapon. Opponents claim that when used correctly, anti-personnel mines are defensive weapons that harm only attackers, unlike ranged weapons such as ballistic missiles that are most effective if used for preemptive attacks. Furthermore, opponents claim that the psychological effect of mines increases the threshold to attack and thus reduces the risk of war.

The Ottawa Treaty does not cover all types of unexploded ordnance. Cluster bombs, for example, introduce the same problem as mines: unexploded bomblets can remain a hazard for civilians long after a conflict has ended. A separate Convention on Cluster Munitions was drafted in 2008 and was adopted and entered into force in 2010. As of February 2022, there are 110 state parties of the CCM. In theory, mines could be replaced by manually triggered Claymore mines, but this requires the posting of a sentry.

Opponents point out that the Ottawa Convention places no restriction whatsoever on anti-vehicle mines which kill civilians on tractors, on school buses, etc. The position of the United States is that the inhumane nature of landmines stems not from whether they are anti-personnel as opposed to anti-vehicle but from their persistence. The United States has unilaterally committed to never using persistent landmines of any kind, whether anti-personnel or anti-vehicle, which they say is a more comprehensive humanitarian measure than the Ottawa Convention. All US landmines now self-destruct in two days or less, in most cases four hours. While the self-destruct mechanism has never failed in more than 65,000 random tests, if self-destruct were to fail the mine will self-deactivate because its battery will run down in two weeks or less. That compares with persistent anti-vehicle mines which remain lethal for about 30 years and are legal under the Ottawa Convention.

Little progress in actual reduction of mine usage has been achieved. In 2011, the number of landmines dispersed is higher than ever since 2004, landmines being dispersed in Libya, Syria, and Myanmar.

Turkey reported that between 1957 and 1998, Turkish forces laid 615,419 antipersonnel mines along the Syrian border "to prevent illegal border crossings". These mines are killing Syrians stuck on the border or trying to cross near Kobanî. Turkey is required under the treaty to destroy all antipersonnel mines, but has missed deadlines. Human Rights Watch claims in its report that as of 18 November 2014, over 2,000 civilians were still in the Tel Shair corridor section of the mine belt because Turkey had been refusing entry for cars or livestock, and the refugees did not want to leave behind their belongings.

Review conferences 
 First Review Conference: 29 November – 3 December 2004, Nairobi, Kenya: Nairobi Summit on a Mine Free World.
 Second Review Conference: 29 November – 4 December 2009, Cartagena, Colombia: Cartagena Summit on a Mine-Free World.
 Third Review Conference: 23–27 June 2014, Maputo, Mozambique: Maputo Review Conference on a Mine-Free World.
Fourth Review Conference: 25–29 November 2019, Oslo, Norway: Oslo Review Conference on a Mine-Free World

Annual meetings 
Annual meetings of the treaty member states are held at different locations around the world. These meetings provide a forum to report on what has been accomplished, indicate where additional work is needed and seek any assistance they may require.
1st meeting of the States Parties in May 1999 in Maputo, Mozambique
2nd meeting of the States Parties in September 2000 in Geneva, Switzerland
3rd meeting of the States Parties in September 2001 in Managua in Managua, Nicaragua
4th meeting of the States Parties in September 2002 in Geneva, Switzerland
5th meeting of the States Parties in September 2003 in Bangkok, Thailand
First Review Conference or Nairobi Summit on a Mine-Free World in November/December 2004 in Nairobi, Kenya
6th meeting of the States Parties in November/December 2005 in Zagreb, Croatia
7th meeting of the States Parties in September 2006 in Geneva, Switzerland
8th meeting of the States Parties in September 2007 at the Dead Sea, Jordan
9th meeting of the States Parties in November 2008 in Geneva, Switzerland
Second Review Conference or Cartagena Summit on a Mine-Free World in November/December 2009 in Cartagena, Colombia
10th meeting of the States Parties in November/December 2010 in Geneva, Switzerland
11th meeting of the States Parties in November/December 2011 in Phnom Penh, Cambodia
12th meeting of the States Parties in November/December 2012 in Geneva, Switzerland
13th meeting of the States Parties in November/December 2013 in Geneva, Switzerland
Third Review Conference or Maputo Review Conference on a Mine-Free World in June 2014 in Maputo, Mozambique
14th meeting of the States Parties in December 2015 in Geneva, Switzerland
15th meeting of the States Parties in November/December 2016 in Santiago, Chile
16th meeting of the States Parties in December 2017 in Vienna, Austria
17th meeting of the States Parties in November 2018 in Geneva, Switzerland
Fourth Review Conference or Oslo Review Conference on a Mine-Free World in November 2019 in Oslo, Norway
18th meeting of the States Parties in November 2020 in Geneva, Switzerland
19th meeting of the States Parties in November 2021 in The Hague, Netherlands

United Nations General Assembly annual resolutions 
A recurrent opportunity for States to indicate their support for the ban on antipersonnel mines is their vote on the annual UN General Assembly (UNGA) resolution calling for universalization and full implementation of the Mine Ban Treaty. UNGA Resolution 66/29, for example, was adopted on 2 December 2011 by a vote of 162 in favor, none opposed, and 18 abstentions.

Since the first UNGA resolution supporting the Mine Ban Treaty in 1997, the number of states voting in favor has ranged from a low of 139 in 1999 to a high of 165 in 2010. The number of states abstaining has ranged from a high of 23 in 2002 and 2003 to a low of 17 in 2005 and 2006.

Of the 19 states not party that voted in support of Resolution 66/29 on 2 December 2011, nine have voted in favor of every Mine Ban Treaty resolution since 1997 (Armenia, Bahrain, Finland, Georgia, Oman, Poland, Singapore, Sri Lanka, and the United Arab Emirates); 10
that consistently abstained or were absent previously now vote in favor (Azerbaijan, China, Kazakhstan, Kyrgyzstan, Lao PDR, Marshall Islands, Micronesia FS, Mongolia, Morocco, and Tonga). Somalia, now a State Party, was absent from the 2011 resolution, but has voted in favor in previous years.

The number of states abstaining from supporting the resolution has ranged from a high of 23 in 2002 and 2003 to a low of 17 in 2010, 2005 and 2006. The group of states that could be described as most concerned about the security implications of the Mine Ban Treaty are the 15 states not party that have voted against consecutive resolutions since 1997: Cuba, Egypt, India, Iran, Israel, Libya (since 1998), Myanmar, North Korea (since 2007), Pakistan, Russia, South Korea, Syria, Uzbekistan (since 1999), the United States, and Vietnam (since 1998).

Key figures in the making of the treaty

Letter-writers and non-governmental organizations 
The Ottawa Anti-Personnel Mines Treaty would not likely have been possible without the sustained effort of thousands of global citizens writing their elected officials in the lead up to the treaty's creation and signing in 1997. A small number of core groups mobilized on the landmines problem worked closely with a wider variety of NGOs, including churches, prominent children's and women's rights groups, disarmament and development groups, in order to produce concerted political pressure, as well as with the media to keep the issue in the forefront. Because of this unparalleled involvement of the global public, and their success in lobbying for this initiative, university political science and law departments frequently study the socio-historical initiatives that led to the Ottawa process, arguing it is a leading modern example of the power of peaceful democratic expression and a method for mobilization on disarmament issues or more broadly.

Jody Williams and The International Campaign to Ban Landmines
The organization the International Campaign to Ban Landmines and its founding coordinator, Jody Williams, were instrumental in the passage of the Ottawa Treaty, and for these efforts they jointly received the 1997 Nobel Peace Prize. However, since efforts to secure the treaty started over a decade before Williams involvement and the fact that the treaty was a joint effort of so many people from all over the world, including hundreds of influential political and private leaders, some felt that Williams should decline to personally benefit from the award of the 1997 Nobel Peace Prize. Williams herself has said she feels the organization deserved the award while she did not, and emphasized the collective nature of the movement; as the chair of a group of female Peace Prize recipients, she has used her status as a Peace Prize recipient to bring concerns of woman-led grassroots organizations to the attention of governments.

Werner Ehrlich
Available sources such as the excellent study on the Ottawa Treaty made by Stuart Maslen and an article published by Werner Ehrlich in 1996 indicate that the key figure in the making of the Ottawa Treaty was the Austrian diplomat Dr. Werner Ehrlich, head of the Disarmament Unit at the Austrian Ministry for Foreign Affairs in 1995/96:

He initiated the process by making the first draft of the future Treaty in April 1996 and succeeded to get this project and the proposed unorthodox procedure – to negotiate this Convention outside the Conference on Disarmament (CD) – adopted by the Ottawa Conference in October 1996 – in spite of nearly universal opposition.
  
It was an uphill struggle. This proposal was understandably rejected by countries which see anti-personnel mines as essential for national defense. Consequently, they tried repeatedly to block the project or to steer it to a dead end in the CD.

The proposal was however also opposed by Countries and NGO's supporting a total ban, because of their conviction that practical measures would be more conducive to a total ban than a Convention, A view which was reflected in the "purpose" of the 1996 Ottawa Conference: "to catalyze practical efforts to move toward a ban and to create partnerships essential to building the necessary political will to achieve a global ban on AP mines."
But this meant in fact, that a total ban was postponed to a remote future:	until practical efforts may have convinced one day Countries depending on APMs for their defense, that APMs are useless or counterproductive.

The approach of Werner Ehrlich was different:

It was essential to delegitimize as soon as possible any use of APMs by the adoption of an instrument of international law on a total ban of APMs, because it would not only bind the Parties to the convention but would also have at least a moral effect on Countries not Parties by clearly contradicting the idea that the use of APMs is legal.

It was also essential to elaborate this Treaty in a free standing negotiating process outside the Conference on Disarmament (CD), as there mine-affected Countries not Members of the CD would be excluded and opponents of a total ban could block the project immediately, e. g. simply by denying consensus to put it on the agenda.

At the Ottawa Conference in October 1996 Ehrlich defended the project of a Total Ban Convention, against opponents of a total ban as well as even against leading humanitarian organizations such as the International Committee of the Red Cross (ICRC) and the International Campaign to Ban Landmines (ICBL), which at the beginning saw the project as premature, as detraction or even as a waste of time. He succeeded finally against all odds – due in particular to the inspired and timely support of the Canadian Minister of Foreign Affairs, Lloyd Axworthy – to get his project indorsed by the Conference:  Austria was tasked to draft the text for the negotiations which were to be held – as proposed – in a free standing negotiating process, a procedure later called the "Ottawa Process".

His third and final draft before leaving disarmament at the end of 1996 to become Austria's Ambassador to the Islamic Republic of Iran was known as the "First Austrian Draft" and served as the basis for the following negotiations leading to the adoption of the Mine Ban Treaty in December 1997

Canada's Mine Action 
Mines Action Canada grew out of the efforts of Canadian non-governmental agencies concerned about the rapidly spreading impact of landmines and cluster munitions.  The group was successful in garnering positive Canadian government attention to the call for a ban by mobilizing Canadians to demand action.  By 1996, sustained and growing citizen action led Minister Axworthy of the Canadian Department of Foreign Affairs and International Trade to collaborate with Mines Action Canada and the International Campaign to Ban Landmines.  This in turn led to the Government of Canada challenging other countries to negotiate and sign a treaty banning ban landmines within one year.  This call to action led directly to the signing of the "Convention on the Prohibition on the Use, Stockpiling, Production and Transfer of Anti-Personnel Mines and on their Destruction" commonly known as the 'mine ban treaty' one year later in December 1997.  Mines Action Canada was hosted by Physicians for Global Survival, chaired by Valerie Warmington and coordinated by Celina Tuttle from the coalition's inception until after the treaty was signed.

Diana, Princess of Wales 
Once in the final stages leading into the treaty, the Ottawa Treaty was ardently championed by Diana, Princess of Wales. In January 1997, she visited Angola and walked near a minefield to dramatize its dangers. In January 1997, Angola's population was approximately 10 million and had about 10–20 million land mines in place from its civil war. In August 1997, she visited Bosnia with the Landmine Survivors Network. Her work with landmines focused on the injuries and deaths inflicted on children. When the Second Reading of the Landmines Bill took place in 1998 in the British House of Commons, Foreign Secretary Robin Cook praised Diana and paid tribute to her work on landmines.

Lloyd Axworthy 
In his Canadian Foreign Affairs portfolio (1996–2000), Lloyd Axworthy became internationally known (and criticized in some quarters) for his advancement of the concept of human security and including the Ottawa Treaty, and the creation of the International Criminal Court.

Bobby Muller
Robert O. (Bobby) Muller (born 1946) is an American peace advocate. He participated in the Vietnam War as a young soldier, and after returning from Vietnam, Muller began to work for veterans' rights and became a peace activist. Since then, Muller founded Vietnam Veterans of America (VVA) in 1978 and Vietnam Veterans of America Foundation (VVAF) in 1980. The VVAF co-founded the International Campaign to Ban Landmines, which won a 1997 Nobel Peace Prize.

See also
Geneva Call, an NGO that engages non-state actors to ban landmines
Geneva International Centre for Humanitarian Demining, host for the secretariat (ISU) of the Ottawa Treaty
Mine action
Convention on Cluster Munitions, a similar treaty banning cluster munitions

Further reading

 Richard Price. 1998. "Reversing the Gun Sights: Transnational Civil Society Targets Land Mines." International Organization 52/3: 613–644.

References

External links
Anti-personnel mines ICRC
 Convention on the Prohibition of Anti-personnel Mines full text
ICBL website (International Campaign to Ban Landmines)
Full text of the treaty in English
Full text of the treaty in multiple languages and formats
Signatories and ratifications

Arms control treaties
International humanitarian law treaties
Mine action
Technological phase-outs
Treaties concluded in 1997
Treaties entered into force in 1999
Treaties of the Afghan Transitional Administration
Treaties of Albania
Treaties of Algeria
Treaties of Andorra
Treaties of Angola
Treaties of Antigua and Barbuda
Treaties of Argentina
Treaties of Australia
Treaties of Austria
Treaties of the Bahamas
Treaties of Bangladesh
Treaties of Barbados
Treaties of Belarus
Treaties of Belgium
Treaties of Belize
Treaties of Benin
Treaties of Bhutan
Treaties of Bolivia
Treaties of Bosnia and Herzegovina
Treaties of Botswana
Treaties of Brazil
Treaties of Brunei
Treaties of Bulgaria
Treaties of Burkina Faso
Treaties of Burundi
Treaties of Cambodia
Treaties of Cameroon
Treaties of Canada
Treaties of Cape Verde
Treaties of the Central African Republic
Treaties of Chad
Treaties of Chile
Treaties of Colombia
Treaties of the Comoros
Treaties of the Democratic Republic of the Congo
Treaties of the Cook Islands
Treaties of Costa Rica
Treaties of Ivory Coast
Treaties of Croatia
Treaties of Cyprus
Treaties of the Republic of the Congo
Treaties of Denmark
Treaties of Djibouti
Treaties of Dominica
Treaties of the Dominican Republic
Treaties of Ecuador
Treaties of El Salvador
Treaties of Equatorial Guinea
Treaties of Eritrea
Treaties of Estonia
Treaties of Ethiopia
Treaties of Fiji
Treaties of Finland
Treaties of France
Treaties of Gabon
Treaties of the Gambia
Treaties of Germany
Treaties of Ghana
Treaties of Greece
Treaties of Grenada
Treaties of Guatemala
Treaties of Guinea
Treaties of Guinea-Bissau
Treaties of Guyana
Treaties of Haiti
Treaties of the Holy See
Treaties of Honduras
Treaties of Hungary
Treaties of Iceland
Treaties of Indonesia
Treaties of Iraq
Treaties of Ireland
Treaties of Italy
Treaties of Jamaica
Treaties of Japan
Treaties of Jordan
Treaties of Kenya
Treaties of Kiribati
Treaties of Kuwait
Treaties of Latvia
Treaties of Lesotho
Treaties of Liberia
Treaties of Liechtenstein
Treaties of Lithuania
Treaties of Luxembourg
Treaties of North Macedonia
Treaties of Madagascar
Treaties of Malawi
Treaties of Malaysia
Treaties of the Maldives
Treaties of Mali
Treaties of Malta
Treaties of Mauritania
Treaties of Mauritius
Treaties of Mexico
Treaties of Moldova
Treaties of Monaco
Treaties of Montenegro
Treaties of Mozambique
Treaties of Namibia
Treaties of Nauru
Treaties of the Netherlands
Treaties of New Zealand
Treaties of Nicaragua
Treaties of Niger
Treaties of Nigeria
Treaties of Niue
Treaties of Norway
Treaties of Oman
Treaties of Palau
Treaties of Panama
Treaties of Papua New Guinea
Treaties of Paraguay
Treaties of Peru
Treaties of the Philippines
Treaties of Poland
Treaties of Portugal
Treaties of Qatar
Treaties of Romania
Treaties of Rwanda
Treaties of Saint Kitts and Nevis
Treaties of Saint Lucia
Treaties of Saint Vincent and the Grenadines
Treaties of Samoa
Treaties of San Marino
Treaties of São Tomé and Príncipe
Treaties of Senegal
Treaties of Serbia
Treaties of Seychelles
Treaties of Sierra Leone
Treaties of Slovakia
Treaties of Slovenia
Treaties of the Solomon Islands
Treaties of South Africa
Treaties of South Sudan
Treaties of Spain
Treaties of the Republic of the Sudan (1985–2011)
Treaties of Suriname
Treaties of Eswatini
Treaties of Sweden
Treaties of Switzerland
Treaties of Tajikistan
Treaties of Tanzania
Treaties of Thailand
Treaties of East Timor
Treaties of Togo
Treaties of Trinidad and Tobago
Treaties of Tunisia
Treaties of Turkey
Treaties of Turkmenistan
Treaties of Tuvalu
Treaties of Uganda
Treaties of Ukraine
Treaties of the United Kingdom
Treaties of Uruguay
Treaties of Vanuatu
Treaties of Venezuela
Treaties of Yemen
Treaties of Zambia
Treaties of Zimbabwe
Treaties extended to Anguilla
Treaties extended to Bermuda
Treaties extended to the British Antarctic Territory
Treaties extended to the British Indian Ocean Territory
Treaties extended to the British Virgin Islands
Treaties extended to the Cayman Islands
Treaties extended to the Falkland Islands
Treaties extended to Montserrat
Treaties extended to the Pitcairn Islands
Treaties extended to Saint Helena, Ascension and Tristan da Cunha
Treaties extended to South Georgia and the South Sandwich Islands
Treaties extended to Akrotiri and Dhekelia
Treaties extended to the Turks and Caicos Islands
Treaties extended to Guernsey
Treaties extended to Jersey
Treaties extended to the Isle of Man
Treaties extended to the Faroe Islands
Treaties extended to Greenland
United Nations treaties
Treaties extended to the Caribbean Netherlands
1997 in Ontario
History of Ottawa